Hwan can refer to:
 South Korean hwan, a defunct currency
 Hwan-guk, a mythical Korean nation
 Hwan (name), Korean given name and name element

See also
Huan (disambiguation)